Maali is a rural locality (a selo) in Gergebilsky District, Republic of Dagestan, Russia. The population was 2,923 as of 2010. There are 41 streets.

Geography 
Maali is located 22 km southwest of Gergebil (the district's administrative centre) by road. Karadakh and Murada are the nearest rural localities.

References 

Rural localities in Gergebilsky District